Siegfried "Siggi" Wentz (born 7 March 1960) is a German former track and field athlete who competed in the decathlon. He is the 1984 Olympic bronze medallist, and a two-time World Championship medallist.

Career
Wentz was born in Rothenbach. In the 1980s and until 1990 he represented West Germany and belonged to the world elite in the decathlon.  His most notable result was winning the bronze medal at the 1984 Summer Olympics in Los Angeles, California.  At that event he scored 8412 points, his results for each of the events were 10.99s - 7.11m - 15.87m - 2.09m - 47.78s - 14.35s - 46.60m - 4.50m - 67.68m - 4:33.96 min.

His personal best result of 8762 points in Filderstadt-Bernhausen on 5 June 1983, placed him third on the world all-time list at that time behind Jürgen Hingsen and Daley Thompson, and still ranks him 14th on the all-time list (as of 2018). It ranks him third among German decathletes, only behind Hingsen and Uwe Freimuth.

After his career in sports, Wentz became a doctor, eventually rising to chief doctor at the Schlüsselbad clinic in Bad Peterstal (Black Forest).

International competitions

Wentz represented USC Mainz sports club.  During his active sport career he was 1.93 meters tall and weighed 93 kilograms.

Publications
Altmaier, Doris; Wentz, Siegfried: Ernährung mit Spaß - Bewegung mit Maß (Nutrition with Fun - Movement with Measure), 2004, Fitness Advisor

See also
 Men's heptathlon world record progression

References

External links
 
 
 

1960 births
Living people
West German decathletes
Athletes (track and field) at the 1984 Summer Olympics
Olympic athletes of West Germany
World Athletics Championships medalists
European Athletics Championships medalists
Medalists at the 1984 Summer Olympics
Olympic bronze medalists for West Germany
Olympic bronze medalists in athletics (track and field)
Universiade medalists in athletics (track and field)
Universiade gold medalists for West Germany
Medalists at the 1987 Summer Universiade